is a 1997 Japanese film directed by Kaizo Hayashi and starring Yuki Uchida and Norika Fujiwara. It is a live-action movie adaptation of the manga series of the same name.

Cast
 Yuki Uchida as Ai Kisugi 
 Norika Fujiwara as Rui Kisugi 
 Izumi Inamori as Hitomi Kisugi
 Kenta Harada as Toshio Utsumi 
 Naoko Yamazaki as Mitsuko Asatani
 Kane Kosugi as Lee/Black Flag
 Wenli Jiang as Miss Wang
 Akaji Maro   
 Shirō Sano as Chief
 Akira Terao

Release
Cat's Eye was released in Japan on August 27, 1997 where it was distributed by Toho.

Merchandise

Video
A behind-the-scenes video was created for the movie, called Cat's Eye Secret.

Photobook
A companion photobook was produced by Wani Books. It contains photographs of the stars in character.

Notes

References

External links
 

Cat's Eye (manga)
1997 films
Live-action films based on manga
1990s Japanese-language films
1990s Japanese films
Films produced by Kazutoshi Wadakura

ja:キャッツ・アイ#実写映画